Schizophyxia is a genus of hubbardiid short-tailed whipscorpions, first described by Monjaraz-Ruedas, Prendini & Francke in 2019.

Species 
, the World Schizomida Catalog accepts the following two species:

 Schizophyxia bartolo (Rowland, 1973) – Mexico
 Schizophyxia lukensi (Rowland, 1973) – Mexico

References 

Schizomida genera